Guerrino-Angelo Canova (4 July 1907 – October 1947) was an Italian racing cyclist. He rode in the 1929 Tour de France.

References

1904 births
1947 deaths
Italian male cyclists
Place of birth missing